The Apartment - Design Your Destiny is the third season of The Apartment, a reality television show which is the longest running reality competition television show in Asia. The concept is that nine teams compete in an interior designing show hosted by Jamie Durie, and judged by both him and Laurence Llewelyn-Bowen. Designed as a pressure stress test, teams will design and decorate a room each week. At the end of the challenge, the winner will walk away with a brand new double-storey home at Elmina, Malaysia. This reality television show is created by Riaz Mehta and produced by Imagine Group.

Deankie and Tiara from the Philippines were declared the winners in this season.

Contestants

Episodes

Elimination 

 Green background and WINNER means the contestant won The Apartment - Design Your Destiny.
 Silver background and RUNNER-UP means the contestant was the runner-up on The Apartment - Design Your Destiny.
 Blue background and WIN means the contestant won that challenge.
 Orange background and BTM 2 mean the contestant worst challenge but safe.
 Lightpink background and ELIM means the contestant lost and was originally eliminated but was saved.
 Red background and ELIM means the contestant lost and was eliminated of the competition.

In episode 8, "Adam & Adrian" were eliminated first and "Pearlyn & Nara" were eliminated second.

References

2013 Malaysian television seasons
Celebrity reality television series
Home renovation television series
Malaysian reality television series
Television shows filmed in Malaysia